Mark Moisevich Rosenthal (1906–1975) was a Soviet philosopher and teacher, specializing in the fields of dialectical materialism, aesthetics, and the history of philosophy. He and Pavel Fyodorovich Yudin were the main authors of A Dictionary of Philosophy, a Soviet dictionary on philosophy.

Life 
Mark Rosenthal was born in Ustia, Ukraine, in 1906. He lost both parents to typhus at an early age.
In 1925 he joined the Communist Party of the Soviet Union (CPSU). He worked at a metal factory and at a sugar mill before being admitted to the School of Philosophy in Moscow in 1928. In 1933, he graduated from the Institute of Red Professors. In 1946 he received a doctorate in philosophy.

Later in life he edited a journal of literary criticism and headed the department of Historical and Dialectical Materialism at the CPSU Central Committee's Higher Party School.

Works 

 Dialectics of the Present Epoch (Novosti, n.d.)
 Contra la sociología vulgar en la teoría literaria (1936)
 Dialéctica materialista (1937)
 Problemas de la Estética de Plejanov (1939)
 El método dialéctico marxista (1951)
 Principios de la lógica dialéctica (1960)
 Lenin y la dialéctica (1963)
 Teoría leninista del conocimiento (1965)
 Dialéctica de El Capital de Marx (1967)
 A Dictionary of Philosophy, written with Pavel Yudin (Progress Publishers, 1967)

Awards 

 Order of the Red Banner of Labour
 Científico de Honor de la RSFSR (1966)

References 

1906 births
1975 deaths
Soviet philosophers
20th-century Russian Jews
20th-century Russian philosophers
Institute of Red Professors alumni
Communist Party of the Soviet Union members
Recipients of the Order of the Red Banner
Recipients of the Order of the Red Banner of Labour